The French composer Guillaume de Machaut was the most prolific composer of his time, with surviving works encompassing many forms, the three formes fixes rondeaux, virelais, ballades, as well as motets, lais and a single representative of the complainte, chanson royale, double hocket and mass genres. Most of his extant output is secular music, a notable exception being the renowned Messe de Nostre Dame. His oeuvre as a whole represents an unprecedented volume of surviving music for a single mediaeval composer, largely in part due to his own efforts to preserve and curate manuscripts for his music. The dominant figure of the  style in late medieval music, Machaut is regarded as the most significant French composer and poet of the 14th century and often seen as the century's leading European composer.

Since many titles are merely the first lines of the texts used, in different sources individual pieces may be referred to by slightly different titles. For example, R20 is known both as Douce dame and Douce dame tant qui vivray. Furthermore, some of Machaut's works (most notably the motets) employ simultaneous performance of several different texts. In such cases, the title of the work lists all texts used, starting from the top voice.

Machaut was the first composer to concentrate on self-anthologization of his works, supervising the creation of three complete-works manuscripts during his life. In the last manuscript, written c. 1370, the scribe wrote Vesci l'ordinance que G. de Machau wet qu'il ait en son livre—Here is the order that G. de Machaut wants his book to have.

Works are organized by genre. The numbering scheme, from the classic edition of Machaut's works by Leo Schrade, does not represent chronology, since few of Machaut's works can be reliably dated.

Ballades
 B1 S'Amours ne fait
 B2 Helas! tant ay dolour
 B3 On ne porroit penser
 B4 Biaute qui toutes autres pere
 B5 Riches d'amour et mendians
 B6 Doulz amis
 B7 J'aim mieus languir
 B8 De desconfort
 B9 Dame, ne regardes pas
 B10 Ne penses pas
 B11 N'en fait n'en dit
 B12 Pour ce que tous mes chans
 B13 Esperance qui m'asseure
 B14 Je ne cuit pas
 B15 Se je me pleing
 B16 Dame, comment qu'amez
 B17 Sanz cuer m'en vois / Amis, dolens/ Dame, par vous
 B18 De petit po
 B19 Amours me fait desirer
 B20 Je sui aussi com cilz
 B21 Se quanque amours
 B22 Il m'est avis
 B23 De Fortune me doy pleindre
 B24 Tres douce dame
 B25 Honte, paour, doubtance
 B26 Donnez, signeurs
 B27 Une vipere en cuer
 B28 Je puis trop bien
 B29 De triste cuer / Quant vrais amans / Certes, je di
 B30 Pas de tor
 B31 De toutes flours
 B32 Ploures, dames
 B33 Nes que on porroit
 B34 Quant Theseus / Ne quier veoir
 B35 Gais et jolis
 B36 Se pour ce muir
 B37 Dame, se vous m'estes
 B38 Phyton, le mervilleus serpent
 B39 Mes esperis
 B40 Ma chiere dame
 B41 En amer a douce vie from Le Remède de Fortune (before 1342)
 B42 Dame, de qui toute ma joie from Le Remède de Fortune (before 1342)

Complainte
 Tels rit au main from Le Remède de Fortune (before 1342)

Chanson royale
 Joie, plaisence from Le Remède de Fortune (before 1342)

Double hocket
 David Hoquetus (1360s)

Lais
 L1 Loyaute, que point ne delay
 L2 J'aim la flour de valour
 L3 Pour ce qu'on puist
 L4 Nuls ne doit avoir
 L5 Par trois raisons
 L6 Amours doucement
 L7 Le lay des dames: Amis t'amour
 L8 Le lay mortel: Un mortel lay weil commencier
 L9 Le lay de l'ymage: Ne say comment commencier
 L10 Le lay de Nostre Dame: Contre ce doulz mois de may
 L11 Le lay de la fonteinne: Je ne cesse de prier
 L12 Le lay de confort: S'onques doulereusement
 L13 Le lay de bonne esperance: Longuement me sui
 L14 Le lay de plour: Malgre fortune
 L15 Le lay de la rose: Pour vivre joliement
 L16 Le lay de plour: Qui bien aimme
 L17 Un lay de consolation: Pour ce que plus proprement
 L18 En demantant
 L19 Qui n'aroit autre deport from Le Remède de Fortune (before 1342)

Mass
 Messe de Nostre Dame (1360s)
 Kyrie
 Gloria
 Credo
 Sanctus
 Agnus Dei
 Ite missa est

Motets
 M1 Quant en moy / Amour et biauté / Amara valde
 M2 De souspirant / Tous corps qui de bien amer / Suspiro
 M3 Fine Amour / He! Mors com tu es haie / Quare non sum mortuus
 M4 Puisque la douce rousee / De Bon Espoir / Speravi
 M5 Qui plus aimme / Aucune gent m'ont demandé / Fiatdfoihweohfwuntas tua
 M6 S'Amours tous amans joir / S'il estoit nulz qui pleindre / Et gaudebit cor vestrum
 M7 Lasse! je sui en aventure / J'ay tant mon cuer / Ego moriar pro te
 M8 Ha! Fortune / Qui es promesses de Fortune / Et non est qui adjuvet
 M9 O livoris feritas / Fons totuis superbie / Fera pessima
 M10 Helas! ou sera pris confors / Hareu! hareu! le feu / Obediens usque ad mortem
 M11 Fins cuers doulz / Dame, je sui cilz / Fins cuers doulz
 M12 Corde mesto cantando / Helas! pour quoy virent / Libera me
 M13 Eins que ma dame / Tant doucement m'ont attrait / Ruina
 M14 De ma dolour / Maugre mon cuer / Quia amore langueo
 M15 Faus Samblant m'a deceu / Amours qui ha le pouoir / Vidi Dominum
 M16 Se j'aim mon loyal ami / Lasse! comment oublieray / Pour quoy me bat mes maris?
 M17 O series summe rata / Quant vraie amour enflamee / Super omnes speciosa
 M18 Bone pastor, qui pastores / Bone pastor, Guillerme / Bone pastor (c. 1324)
 M19 Diligenter inquiramus / Martyrum gemma latria / A Christo honoratus
 M20 Biaute paree de valour / Trop plus est belle / Je ne sui mie certeins
 M21 Veni creator spiritus / Christe, quie lux es / Tribulatio proxima est et non est qui adjuvet (c. 1358–60 or later)
 M22 Plange, regni respublica / Tu qui gregem tuum ducis / Apprehende arma et scutum et exurge (c. 1358–60 or later)
 M23 Inviolata genitrix / Felix virgo / Ad te suspiramus gementes et flentes (c. 1358–60 or later)
 M24 De touz les biens / Li enseignement / Ecce tu pulchra es amica mea (doubtful)

Rondeaux

 R1 Doulz viaire gracieus
 R2 Helas! pour quoy
 R3 Merci vous pri
 R4 Sans cuer, dolens
 R5 Quant j'ay l'espart
 R6 Cinc, un, treze
 R7 Se vous n'estes
 R8 Vos doulz resgars
 R9 Tant doucement
 R10 Rose, liz, printemps
 R11 Comment puet on mieus
 R12 Ce qui soustient
 R13 Dame, se vous n'aves aperceu
 R14 Ma fin est mon commencement
 R15 Certes, mon oueil
 R16 Dame, qui weult
 R17 Dix et sept, cinc, trese
 R18 Puis qu'en oubli
 R19 Quant ma dame les maus
 R20 Douce dame tant qui vivray
 R21 Quant je ne voy
 R22 Dame, mon cuer from Le Remède de Fortune (before 1342)

Virelais
 V1 He! dame de vaillance
 V2 Layaute weil tous jours
 V3 Ay mi! dame de valour
 V4 Douce dame jolie
 V5 Comment qu'a moy
 V6 Se ma dame
 V7 Puis que ma dolour
 V8 Dou mal qui m'a longuement
 V9 Dame, je weil endurer
 V10 De bonte, de valour
 V11 He! dame de valour
 V12 Dame, a qui m'ottri
 V13 Quant je sui mis
 V14 J'aim sans penser
 V15 Se mesdisans
 V16 C'est force, faire le weil
 V17 Dame, vostre doulz viaire
 V18 Helas! et comment
 V19 Dieus, Biaute, Douceur
 V20 Se d'amer
 V21 Je vivroie liement
 V22 Foy porter
 V23 Tres bonne et belle
 V24 En mon cuer
 V25 Tuit mi penser
 V26 Mors sui, se je ne vous voy
 V27 Liement me deport
 V28 Plus dure que un dyamant
 V29 Dame, mon cuer emportes
 V30 Se je souspir
 V31 Moult sui de bonne heure nee
 V32 De tout sui si confortee
 V33 Dame, a vous sans retollier from Le Remède de Fortune (before 1342)

Alternate cataloging
The works from Le Remède de Fortune have presented a problem for modern-day collections, as they appeared in the manuscript in the poem, not with other works of its genre. Thus, occasionally Le Remède de Fortune works are given their own category and catalogued according to the order of their appearance:
 RF1 Qui n'aroit autre deport (Lai)
 RF2 Tels rit au main (Complainte)
 RF3 Joie, plaisence (Chanson Royale)
 RF4 En amer a douce vie (Balladele)
 RF5 Dame, de qui toute ma joie (Ballade)
 RF6 Dame, a vous sans retoller (Chanson Baladée)
 RF7 Dame, mon cuer (Rondeau)

References

Sources
Books and chapters

 
 

Journal and encyclopedia articles

  
  
 
  

Online

External links
 
 
 Works by Guillaume de Machaut in the Medieval Music Database from La Trobe University

Machaut, Guillaume de